Sesil Karatantcheva was the defending champion, but lost to Shelby Rogers in the first round.

Madison Keys won the title, defeating Maria Sanchez in the final, 6–3, 7–6(7–1).

Seeds

Main draw

Finals

Top half

Bottom half

References 
 Main draw

Goldwater Women's Tennis Classic - Singles